Garbiñe Muguruza and Romina Oprandi were the defending champions, but they chose not to participate this year. 
Tímea Babos and Kristina Mladenovic won the title, defeating Laura Siegemund and Maryna Zanevska in the final, 6–1, 7–6(7–5).

Seeds

Draw

Draw

References
 Main Draw

Grand Prix SAR La Princesse Lalla Meryem - Doubles
2015 Doubles
2015 in Moroccan tennis